Fianga is a town in Chad and capital of the Mont Illi district.

Demographics

References

Mayo-Kebbi Est Region
Populated places in Chad